Maia Azarashvili (born 6 April 1964 in Tbilisi) is a retired Georgian sprinter who specialized in the 200 metres, representing the USSR and Georgia (since 1992).

Azarashvili was a semi-finalist at the 1987 World Championships in Rome. At the 1988 Olympic Games, she finished seventh in the 200 metres and then won a bronze medal as a member of the Soviet Union 4x100 metres relay squad (she ran in the heats but not the final).

Representing Georgia, Azarashvili went on to finish fifth at the 1994 European Championships in Helsinki. She competed at the World Championships in 1993 and 1995 without reaching the finals there.

External links

1964 births
Living people
Sportspeople from Tbilisi
Soviet female sprinters
Female sprinters from Georgia (country)
Athletes (track and field) at the 1988 Summer Olympics
Athletes (track and field) at the 1996 Summer Olympics
Olympic athletes of the Soviet Union
Olympic athletes of Georgia (country)
Olympic bronze medalists for the Soviet Union
World Athletics Championships athletes for the Soviet Union
World Athletics Championships athletes for Georgia (country)
Olympic bronze medalists in athletics (track and field)
Goodwill Games medalists in athletics
Medalists at the 1988 Summer Olympics
Competitors at the 1986 Goodwill Games
Olympic female sprinters
Friendship Games medalists in athletics